The 2nd Aston Martin Owners Club Formula 2 Race was a Formula Two motor race held on 18 April 1953 at Snetterton Circuit, Norfolk. The race was run over 10 laps of the circuit, and was won by British driver Eric Thompson in a Connaught Type A-Lea Francis. Bob Gerard in a Cooper T23-Bristol was second and Peter Whitehead in a Cooper T24-Alta was third. Bobbie Baird in a Ferrari 500 set fastest lap.

Results

References

Aston Martin Owners Club F2 Race
Aston Martin Owners Club F2 Race
Aston Martin Owners Club F2 Race